Mahim Bora (6 July 1924 – 5 August 2016) was an Indian writer and educationist from Assam. He was elected as a president of the Assam Sahitya Sabha held in 1989 at Doomdooma. He was awarded most notably the Padma Shri in 2011, the Sahitya Akademi Award in 2001 and the Assam Valley Literary Award in 1998. Assam Sahitya Sabha conferred its highest honorary title Sahityacharyya on him in 2007.

Brief life
Mahim Bora was born on 6 July 1924 in Ghopesadharu, a tea estate in Sonitpur district. He spent his childhood in his home village Ramtamuli Chuk, Hatbar.

Education

He did his primary schooling at Primary Hatbar L.P. School, Hatbar M.E. Kuwarital Combined M.V. School. He passed Matriculation at Kaliabar Government aided High School and did Intermediate at Nowgong College, Nagaon (Assam) in 1946. He received B.A. from Cotton College, Guwahati (Assam) and M.A. in Assamese literature from Guwahati University, Guwahati.

After taking his M.A. degree he first joined service as a teacher at Kaliabar H.E.School, Nagaon & Kamrup Academy, Guwahati. He was assistant editor of Rangghar Children Magazine (now defunct) and also worked as conductor of Gaonlia Raijole in All India Radio, Guwahati. He later joined as an Assamese lecturer in J.B.College, Jorhat (Assam), and lastly he shifted to Nowgong College, Nagaon permanently and retired as Head of the Assamese Department. He was also the founder lecturer of A.D.P. college and Girl's college Nagaon.
Achievement

He was President of Nowgong District Sahitya Sabha, Assam Sahitya Sabha:Kavi Sanmilan (1978) and Assam Sahitya Sabha (1989–90).

Family

He married Dipti Rekha Hazarika of Jamuguri on 1 May 1957. He was father of two sons. His wife died on 20 Jan of 1999. His younger son Lt. Dr. Abhijit Bora died in 2005. 

Death

He died on 5 August 2016 in a private hospital of Guwahati at the age of 93. He was cremated with full State honours in Nagaon.

Literary works
Bora's chief anthology of poems was Rangajiya (The Red Dragon-fly, 1978). In his short stories, he was an observer of folk and rural situations. He was a regular contributor of short stories to various periodicals.

Short Story collection:
Kathanibari Ghat (1961),
Deha Garaka Prem (1967),
Moi Pipali Aru Puja (1967),
Bahubhuji Tribhuj (1967),
Akhan Nadir Mrityu (1972),
Rati Phula Phul (1977),
Borjatri (1980),
Mor Priya Galpa (1987) and

Collection of Essays:
Chinta Bichitra (1989),
Sahitya Bichitra (1989),

Novels:  
Herua Digantar Maya (1972),
Edhani Mahir Hanhi (2001),
Banduli Phular Rang (2007) and
Putala Ghar (1973)

Children literatures:  
Batris Putalar Sadhu (1976) and
Tezimala Aru Cindarela (2007)

Translations: 
Raja Rammohan Ray

Edited Book:
Sankardevar Nat (1989)

Poetry Collection: 
Ranga Jia (1978),
Jonamanir hanhi;

Radio Plays:
Laru Gopalar Prem,
Laru Gopalar Bibah,
Laru Gopalar Ghar-Sansar,
Padum Kunwari (1951),
Nirmal Bhakat (1951),
Pansha Sar,
Garakhia Bhim (1951),
Tinir Tini Gal,
Tup,
Mas aru Manuh,
Batar Akosh Bagari Edited by T. Goswami,
Momair podulit bandhilu ghura,
'Pakhi Loga Din' edited by G.C. Das,
Pabandha Bisitra edited by G.C.Das.

Awards
 Padma Shri award in 2011 in the field of Literature and Education by the Government of India 
 Sahitya Akademi Award (for Assamese) in 2001 for his novel Edhani Mahir Hahi.
 Assam Valley Literary Award (1998) 
Chhaganlal Jain award for his collection of stories  Galpa Samagra in 1966 .
Assam Publication Board literary award 
for  Rati PhuLa Phul in 1980.
Ganesh Gogoi Award in 2015.
Sahityacharyya honour in 2007.

See also
 Assamese literature
 List of Asam Sahitya Sabha presidents
 List of Assamese-language poets
 List of Assamese writers with their pen names

References

External links 
 Read Translated Short Stories and Poems of Mahim Bora
 Read 4 Short Stories of Mahim Bora Translated by Lalit Saikia
 Indian Review congratulates Mahim Bora on Winning the Padma Shri

1924 births
2016 deaths
People from Sonitpur district
Poets from Assam
Cotton College, Guwahati alumni
Gauhati University alumni
Recipients of the Padma Shri in literature & education
Recipients of the Sahitya Akademi Award in Assamese
Recipients of the Assam Valley Literary Award
Asom Sahitya Sabha Presidents
Scholars from Assam
20th-century Indian educational theorists
20th-century Indian poets